Dazzle camouflage, also known as razzle dazzle (in the U.S.) or dazzle painting, is a family of ship camouflage that was used extensively in World War I, and to a lesser extent in World War II and afterwards. Credited to the British marine artist Norman Wilkinson, though with a rejected prior claim by the zoologist John Graham Kerr, it consisted of complex patterns of geometric shapes in contrasting colours interrupting and intersecting each other.

Unlike other forms of camouflage, the intention of dazzle is not to conceal but to make it difficult to estimate a target's range, speed, and heading. Norman Wilkinson explained in 1919 that he had intended dazzle primarily to mislead the enemy about a ship's course and so cause them to take up a poor firing position.

Dazzle was adopted by the Admiralty in the UK, and then by the United States Navy. Each ship's dazzle pattern was unique to avoid making classes of ships instantly recognisable to the enemy. The result was that a profusion of dazzle schemes was tried, and the evidence for their success was, at best, mixed. So many factors were involved that it was impossible to determine which were important, and whether any of the colour schemes were effective. Experiments were carried out on aircraft in both World Wars with little success.

Dazzle attracted the notice of artists such as Picasso, who claimed that Cubists like himself had invented it. Edward Wadsworth, who supervised the camouflaging of over 2,000 ships during the First World War, painted a series of canvases of dazzle ships after the war, based on his wartime work. Arthur Lismer similarly painted a series of dazzle ship canvases.

Intended purposes

At first glance, dazzle seems an unlikely form of camouflage, drawing attention to the ship rather than hiding it. The approach was developed after Allied navies were unable to develop effective means to hide ships in all weather conditions. The British zoologist John Graham Kerr proposed the application of camouflage to British warships in the First World War, outlining what he believed to be the applicable principle, disruptive camouflage, in a letter to Winston Churchill in 1914 explaining the goal was to confuse, not to conceal, by disrupting a ship's outline. Kerr compared the effect to that created by the patterns on a series of land animals, the giraffe, zebra and jaguar.

Taking up the zebra example, Kerr proposed that the vertical lines of ships' masts be disrupted with irregular white bands. Hiding these would make ships less conspicuous, and would "greatly increase the difficulty of accurate range finding". However, in the same letter, Kerr also called for countershading, the use of paint to obliterate self-shading and thus to flatten out the appearance of solid, recognisable shapes. For example, he proposed painting ships' guns grey on top, grading to white below, so the guns would disappear against a grey background.

Similarly, he advised painting shaded parts of the ship white, and brightly lit parts in grey, again with smooth grading between them, making shapes and structures invisible. Kerr was thus hoping to achieve both a measure of invisibility and a degree of confusion for the enemy using a rangefinder. Whether through this mixing of goals, or the Admiralty's skepticism about "any theory based upon the analogy of animals", the Admiralty claimed in July 1915 to have conducted "various trials" and decided to paint its ships in monotone grey, not adopting any of Kerr's suggestions. It had made up its mind, and all Kerr's subsequent letters achieved nothing.

The American artist Abbott Handerson Thayer had developed a theory of camouflage based on countershading and disruptive coloration, which he had published in the controversial 1909 book Concealing-Coloration in the Animal Kingdom. Seeing the opportunity to put his theory into service, Thayer wrote to Churchill in February 1915, proposing to camouflage submarines by countershading them like fish such as mackerel, and advocating painting ships white to make them invisible. His ideas were considered by the Admiralty, but rejected along with Kerr's proposals as being "freak methods of painting ships ... of academic interest but not of practical advantage". 

The Admiralty noted that the required camouflage would vary depending on the light, the changing colours of sea and sky, the time of day, and the angle of the sun. Thayer made repeated and desperate efforts to persuade the authorities, and in November 1915 travelled to England where he gave demonstrations of his theory around the country. He had a warm welcome from Kerr in Glasgow, and was so enthused by this show of support that he avoided meeting the War Office, who he had been intending to win over, and instead sailed home, continuing to write ineffective letters to the British and American authorities.

The marine artist and Royal Naval Volunteer Reserve officer Norman Wilkinson, agreed with Kerr that dazzle's aim was confusion rather than concealment, but disagreed about the type of confusion to be sown in the enemy's mind. What Wilkinson wanted to do was to make it difficult for an enemy to estimate a ship's type, size, speed, and heading, and thereby confuse enemy ship commanders into taking mistaken or poor firing positions. An observer would find it difficult to know exactly whether the stern or the bow was in view; and it would be correspondingly difficult to estimate whether the observed vessel was moving towards or away from the observer's position.

Wilkinson advocated "masses of strongly contrasted colour" to confuse the enemy about a ship's heading. Thus, while dazzle, in some lighting conditions or at close ranges, might actually increase a ship's visibility, the conspicuous patterns would obscure the outlines of the ship's hull (though admittedly not the superstructure), disguising the ship's correct heading and making it harder to hit.

Dazzle was created in response to an extreme need, and hosted by an organisation, the Admiralty, which had already rejected an approach supported by scientific theory: Kerr's proposal to use "parti-colouring" based on the known camouflage methods of disruptive coloration and countershading. This was dropped in favour of an admittedly non-scientific approach, led by the socially well-connected Wilkinson. Kerr's explanations of the principles were clear, logical, and based on years of study, while Wilkinson's were simple and inspirational, based on an artist's perception. The decision was likely because the Admiralty felt comfortable with Wilkinson, in sharp contrast to their awkward relationship with the stubborn and pedantic Kerr.

Wilkinson claimed not to have known of the zoological theories of camouflage of Kerr and Thayer, admitting only to having heard of the "old invisibility-idea" from Roman times.

Possible mechanisms

Disrupting rangefinding

In 1973, the naval museum curator Robert F. Sumrall (following Kerr) suggested a mechanism by which dazzle camouflage may have sown the kind of confusion that Wilkinson had intended for it. Coincidence rangefinders used for naval artillery had an optical mechanism, operated by a human to compute the range. The operator adjusted the mechanism until the two half-images of the target lined up in a complete picture. Dazzle, Sumrall argued, was intended to make that hard, as clashing patterns looked abnormal even when the two halves were aligned, something that became more important when submarine periscopes included such rangefinders. Patterns sometimes also included a false bow wave to make it difficult for an enemy to estimate the ship's speed.

Disguising heading and speed

The historian Sam Willis argued that since Wilkinson knew it was impossible to make a ship invisible with paint, the "extreme opposite" was the answer, using conspicuous shapes and violent colour contrasts to confuse enemy submarine commanders. Willis pointed out, using the  dazzle scheme as an example, that different mechanisms could have been at work. The contradictory patterns on the ship's funnels could imply the ship was on a different heading (as Wilkinson had said). The curve on the hull below the front funnel could seem to be a false bow wave, creating a misleading impression of the ship's speed. And the striped patterns at bow and stern could create confusion about which end of the ship was which.

That dazzle did indeed work along these lines is suggested by the testimony of a U-boat captain:

Motion dazzle

In 2011, the scientist Nicholas E. Scott-Samuel and colleagues presented evidence using moving patterns on a computer that human perception of speed is distorted by dazzle patterns. If such a dazzling target causes a 7% confusion in the observed speed, a rocket propelled grenade travelling that distance in half a second would strike  from the intended aiming point, or 7% of the distance moved by the target. This might be enough to save lives in the dazzle-patterned vehicle, and perhaps to cause the missile to miss entirely.

World War I

British Royal Navy

In 1914, Kerr persuaded the First Lord of the Admiralty, Winston Churchill, to adopt a form of military camouflage which he called "parti-colouring". He argued both for countershading (following the American artist Abbott Thayer), and for disruptive coloration, both as used by animals. A general order to the British fleet issued on 10 November 1914 advocated use of Kerr's approach. However, following Churchill's departure from the Admiralty, the Royal Navy reverted to plain grey paint schemes, informing Kerr in July 1915 that "various trials had been undertaken and that the range of conditions of light and surroundings rendered it necessary to modify considerably any theory based upon the analogy of [the colours and patterns of] animals".

The British Army inaugurated its Camouflage Section for land use at the end of 1916. At sea in 1917, heavy losses of merchant ships to Germany's unrestricted submarine warfare campaign led to new desire for camouflage. The marine painter Norman Wilkinson promoted a system of stripes and broken lines "to distort the external shape by violent colour contrasts" and confuse the enemy about the speed and dimensions of a ship. 

Wilkinson, then a lieutenant commander on Royal Navy patrol duty, implemented the precursor of "dazzle" beginning with the merchantman SS Industry. Wilkinson was put in charge of a camouflage unit which used the technique on large groups of merchant ships. Over 4000 British merchant ships were painted in what came to be known as "dazzle camouflage"; dazzle was also applied to some 400 naval vessels, starting in August 1917.

All British patterns were different, first tested on small wooden models viewed through a periscope in a studio. Most of the model designs were painted by women from London's Royal Academy of Arts. A foreman then scaled up their designs for the real thing. Painters, however, were not alone in the project. Creative people including sculptors, artists, and set designers designed camouflage.

Wilkinson's dazzle camouflage was accepted by the Admiralty, even without practical visual assessment protocols for improving performance by modifying designs and colours. The dazzle camouflage strategy was adopted by other navies. This led to more scientific studies of colour options which might enhance camouflage effectiveness.

After the war, starting on 27 October 1919, an Admiralty committee met to determine who had priority for the invention of dazzle. Kerr was asked whether he thought Wilkinson had personally benefited from anything that he, Kerr, had written. Kerr avoided the question, implying that he had not, and said "I make no claim to have invented the principle of parti-colouring, this principle was, of course, invented by nature". He agreed also that he had not suggested anywhere in his letters that his system would "create an illusion as to the course of the vessel painted". In October 1920 the Admiralty told Kerr that he was not seen as responsible for dazzle painting. In 1922 Wilkinson was awarded the sum of £2000 for the invention.

Royal Flying Corps

In the First World War, experiments were conducted on British aircraft such as the Royal Flying Corps' Sopwith Camels to make their angle and direction difficult to judge for an enemy gunner. Similarly the Royal Navy painted some of their Felixstowe flying boats with bold disrupting lines similar to those of their ship camouflage. The effect remained dubious, but was found to reduce the incidence of the planes being targeted by anti-aircraft gunners on their own side.

Effectiveness

Dazzle's effectiveness was highly uncertain at the time of the First World War, but it was nonetheless adopted both in the UK and North America. In 1918, the Admiralty analysed shipping losses, but was unable to draw clear conclusions. Dazzle ships had been attacked in 1.47% of sailings, compared to 1.12% for uncamouflaged ships, suggesting increased visibility, but as Wilkinson had argued, dazzle was not attempting to make ships hard to see. Suggestively, of the ships that were struck by torpedoes, 43% of the dazzle ships sank, compared to 54% of the uncamouflaged.

Similarly, 41% of the dazzle ships were struck amidships, compared to 52% of the uncamouflaged. These comparisons could be taken to imply that submarine commanders had more difficulty in deciding where a ship was heading and where to aim. Furthermore, the ships painted in dazzle were larger than the uncamouflaged ships, 38% of them being over 5000 tons compared to only 13% of uncamouflaged ships, making comparisons unreliable.

With hindsight, too many factors (choice of colour scheme; size and speed of ships; tactics used) had been varied for it to be possible to determine which factors were significant or which schemes worked best. Thayer did carry out an experiment on dazzle camouflage, but it failed to show any reliable advantage over plain paintwork.

The American data were analysed by Harold Van Buskirk in 1919. About 1,256 ships were painted in dazzle between 1 March 1918 and the end of the war on 11 November that year. Among American merchantmen 2,500 tons and over, 78 uncamouflaged ships were sunk, and only 18 camouflaged ships; out of these 18, 11 were sunk by torpedoes, 4 in collisions and 3 by mines. No US Navy ships (all camouflaged) were sunk in the period.

World War II

Ships

However effective dazzle camouflage may have been in World War I, it became less useful as rangefinders and especially aircraft became more advanced, and, by the time it was put to use again in World War II, radar further reduced its effectiveness. However, it may still have confounded enemy submarines.

In the Royal Navy, dazzle paint schemes reappeared in January 1940. These were unofficial, and competitions were often held between ships for the best camouflage patterns. The Royal Navy's Camouflage Department came up with a scheme devised by a young naval officer, Peter Scott, a wildlife artist, which were developed into the Western Approaches Schemes. In 1942 the Admiralty Intermediate Disruptive Pattern came into use, followed in 1944 by the Admiralty Standard Schemes. Dazzle patterns were tested on small model ships at the Royal Navy's Directorate of Camouflage in Leamington Spa; these were painted and then viewed in a shallow tank on the building's roof.

The United States Navy implemented a camouflage painting program in World War II, and applied it to many ship classes, from patrol craft and auxiliaries to battleships and some s. The designs (known as Measures, each identified with a number) were not arbitrary, but were standardised in a process which involved a planning stage, then a review, and then fleet-wide implementation. 

Not all United States Navy measures involved dazzle patterns; some were simple or even totally unsophisticated, such as a false bow wave on traditional Haze Gray, or Deck Blue replacing grey over part or all of the ship (the latter to counter the kamikaze threat). Dazzle measures were used until 1945; in February 1945 the United States Navy's Pacific Fleet decided to repaint its ships in non-dazzle measures against the kamikaze threat, while the Atlantic Fleet continued to use dazzle, ships being repainted if transferred to the Pacific.

Nazi Germany's Kriegsmarine first used camouflage in the 1940 Norwegian campaign. A wide range of patterns were authorised, but most commonly black and white diagonal stripes were used. Most patterns were designed to hide ships in harbour or near the coast; they were often painted over with plain grey when operating in the Atlantic.

Aircraft
In 1940, the US Navy conducted experiments with dazzle-type camouflage for aircraft. The artist McClelland Barclay designed "pattern camouflage" schemes for US Navy aircraft such as the Douglas TBD Devastator and the Brewster F2A Buffalo to make it difficult for the enemy to gauge the shape and position of the aircraft. The camouflaged aircraft were flown in combat, but the effect was found not to be satisfactory.

Since World War II

Renewed naval use 

In 2019, the Royal Canadian Navy frigate HMCS Regina was painted in a 1944 pattern to commemorate the 75th anniversary of the Battle of the Atlantic; the pattern was described variously as "dazzle" and "disruptive". It described this as "dazzle camouflage", making the ship the first Royal Navy vessel to have such a paint scheme since the Second World War. It stated that the scheme was "more about supporting the unique identity of the squadron" than for concealment.

In 2013, the United States Navy littoral combat ship USS Freedom used the "Measure 32" paint scheme during a deployment to Singapore.

Arts 

The abstract patterns in dazzle camouflage inspired artists including Picasso. He claimed credit for camouflage experiments, which seemed to him a quintessentially Cubist technique. In a conversation with Gertrude Stein shortly after he first saw a painted cannon trundling through the streets of Paris he remarked, "Yes it is we who made it, that is cubism". In Britain, Edward Wadsworth, who supervised dazzle camouflage painting in the war, created a series of canvases after the war based on his dazzle work on ships. In Canada, Arthur Lismer used dazzle ships in some of his wartime compositions. In America, Burnell Poole painted canvases of United States Navy ships in dazzle camouflage at sea. The historian of camouflage Peter Forbes comments that the ships had a Modernist look, their designs succeeding as avant-garde or Vorticist art.

In 2007, the art of camouflage, including the evolution of dazzle, was featured as the theme for a show at the Imperial War Museum. In 2009, the Fleet Library at the Rhode Island School of Design exhibited its rediscovered collection of lithographic printed plans for the camouflage of American World War I merchant ships, in an exhibition titled "Bedazzled".

In 2014, the Centenary Art Commission backed three dazzle camouflage installations in Britain: Carlos Cruz-Diez covered the pilot ship  in Liverpool's Canning Dock with bright multi-coloured dazzle artwork, as part of the city's 2014 Liverpool Biennial art festival; and Tobias Rehberger painted , anchored since 1922 at Blackfriars Bridge in London, to commemorate the use of dazzle, a century on.

Other uses

In civilian life, patterns reminiscent of dazzle camouflage are sometimes used to mask a test car during trials, to make determining its exterior design difficult. During the 2015 Formula 1 testing period, the Red Bull RB11 car was painted in a scheme intended to confound rival teams' ability to analyse its aerodynamics. 

The designer Adam Harvey has similarly proposed a form of camouflage reminiscent of dazzle for personal camouflage from face-detection technology, which he calls computer vision dazzle. Its intention is to block detection by facial recognition technologies such as DeepFace "by creating an 'anti-face. It uses occlusion, covering certain facial features; transformation, altering the shape or colour of parts of the face; and a combination of the two.

The Sea Shepherd Conservation Society has used dazzle patterns on its fleet since 2009 for recognition rather than camouflage.

See also
 Hanshugasa, a type of conical helmet developed by Takashima Shūhan with similar anti-rangefinding properties

Notes

References

Sources
 Forbes, Peter (2009). Dazzled and Deceived: Mimicry and Camouflage. Yale University Press. .
 Williams, David (2001). Naval camouflage, 1914–1945: a complete visual reference. Naval Institute Press. .

Further reading
 Behrens, Roy R., ed. (2012). Ship Shape: A Dazzle Camouflage Sourcebook. Bobolink Books. .

External links

 Newly discovered dazzle plans at Rhode Island School of Design
 The development of naval camouflage 1914–1945
 Artists and other contributors to camouflage in the 20th century
 Camoupedia: dazzle camouflage
 Razzle dazzle camouflage
 "She's All Dressed Up For Peace", Popular Science (February 1919), p. 55.
 "Fighting the U-Boat with Paint", Popular Science (April 1919), pp. 17–19.
 Destroyer Escort Historical Museum: USS Slater  painted in 1945 Dazzle camouflage
 US Navy PT Boats in Dazzle Camouflage
 Catalogue of US Navy World War II ships in Dazzle Camouflage

Military camouflage
Naval warfare